Elsa Helena Andersson, later Cordes (August 19, 1894 – January 26, 1994), was a Swedish diver who competed in the 1912 Summer Olympics. She was born in Stockholm and died in San Francisco, United States.

In 1912 she finished sixth in the 10 metre platform competition.

References

External links
Elsa Andersson's profile at Sports Reference.com

1894 births
1994 deaths
Swedish female divers
Olympic divers of Sweden
Divers at the 1912 Summer Olympics
Divers from Stockholm
19th-century Swedish women
20th-century Swedish women